Joel Per Lundqvist (born 2 March 1982) is a Swedish professional ice hockey centre for Frölunda HC of Swedish Hockey League (SHL). He serves as the team's captain. He is the identical twin brother of former National Hockey League goaltender Henrik Lundqvist. He previously played in the NHL for the Dallas Stars from 2006 to 2009. He is the holder of the player with the most appearances in the SHL.

Early life
Joel and identical twin brother Henrik, a retired 15-year goalie with the New York Rangers of the NHL, were born to Eva Johansson and Peter Lundqvist. They grew up in Åre, Jämtland, an area where alpine skiing is the most popular winter activity, but Henrik and Joel chose to play ice hockey over the more popular winter sports. During the winters their kindergarten teachers used the kindergarten's 9 meters × 3 meters (30 ft × 10 ft) sandpit to freeze an outdoor ice rink where the twins would frequently skate. Their interest in hockey grew even larger when their father Peter took the twins to see Frölunda HC play in Scandinavium, Gothenburg. Peter worked for a company who sponsored Frölunda, and Henrik and Joel saw many games in Scandinavium and Frölunda became their favourite team. In 1990 Henrik and Joel joined Järpens IF and started playing organized hockey for the first time. During one practice when the coach asked if anyone wanted to be a goaltender Joel grabbed and raised Henrik's arm and said that his brother would like to.

In 1993 the family moved to Båstad, Skåne, in southern Sweden to support their older sister Gabriella's tennis career. Henrik and Joel joined local team Rögle BK, and were both selected for Scania's regional team in Sverigepucken in 1995. Henrik was selected to play for Scania in TV-pucken in 1996, and in 1997 when Joel was also selected. During the 1997–98 season Henrik and Joel were extensively scouted by Frölunda, and while playing for Rögle in the 1998 Scandinavium Cup in Gothenburg, Frölunda's junior team manager and U16 coach Janne Karlsson contacted their father, who told Henrik and Joel about Frölunda's interest in them while driving home to Båstad.

Playing career
He was selected by the Dallas Stars in the 2000 NHL Entry Draft (third round, 68th overall) and signed a one-year, entry-level, two-way contract with them in May 2006. He started his 2006 season in Iowa Stars scoring 38 points in 40 games but was called up and played his first game in Dallas on 3 December 2006. Lundqvist played 7 games in his first NHL playoff series, scoring two goals, and was assigned back to Iowa when Dallas was eliminated.

Lundqvist scored his first career NHL goal against Calgary Flames goaltender Miikka Kiprusoff on 17 January 2007.

His identical twin brother Henrik had a successful rookie season as goaltender for the New York Rangers in the 2005–06 season. He was afforded the opportunity to play his twin brother on December 14, 2006, in Dallas. It was the first time that a goaltender faced his twin. He and his brother are only the third set of twins to play each other in an NHL game in the history of the league.

In 2009, he returned to his native Sweden, signing with Frölunda HC. In 2011, Lundqvist became the October nominee for Guldpucken. Serving as team captain, he led Frölunda to win the 2016 Swedish national championship as well as the Champions Hockey League (CHL). In 2017, Frölunda repeated as CHL champions with Lundqvist earning Most Valuable Player honors.

Career statistics

Regular season and playoffs

International

Awards and honors

See also
List of family relations in the NHL

References

External links

1982 births
Living people
Dallas Stars draft picks
Dallas Stars players
Frölunda HC players
Identical twins
Iowa Stars players
People from Åre Municipality
Swedish expatriate ice hockey players in the United States
Swedish ice hockey centres
Swedish twins
Twin sportspeople
Ice hockey players at the 2018 Winter Olympics
Olympic ice hockey players of Sweden
Sportspeople from Jämtland County